Benzingia is a genus of flowering plants from the orchid family, Orchidaceae. It is native to mountains of Central America and northwestern South America from Costa Rica to Peru.

Species 
 nine species are recognized:

 Benzingia caudata (Ackerman) Dressler  – Peru (Cordillera del Cóndor), Ecuador
 Benzingia cornuta (Garay) Dressler - Colombia, Ecuador
 Benzingia estradae (Dodson) Dodson - Ecuador
 Benzingia hajekii (D.E.Benn. & Christenson) Dressler  – Peru
 Benzingia hirtzii Dodson - Ecuador (Esmeraldas)
 Benzingia jarae (D.E.Benn. & Christenson) Dressler – Peru 
 Benzingia palorae (Dodson & Hirtz) Dressler  - Colombia, Ecuador
 Benzingia reichenbachiana (Schltr.) Dressler - Costa Rica, Panama
 Benzingia thienii (Dodson) P.A.Harding - Ecuador

See also 
 List of Orchidaceae genera

References

External links 

Orchids of South America
Orchids of Central America
Zygopetalinae genera
Zygopetalinae